Luis Eduardo Suárez (15 July 1938 – 20 June 2005) was an Argentine footballer. He was capped by the Argentina national team twice in 1962. He also played in the United States for the New York Skyliners.

Career statistics

International

References

1938 births
2005 deaths
Argentine footballers
Argentine expatriate footballers
Argentina international footballers
Association football forwards
Club Atlético Banfield footballers
Club Atlético Independiente footballers
Club Atlético Huracán footballers
C.A. Cerro players
Argentine expatriate sportspeople in Uruguay
Expatriate footballers in Uruguay
Argentine expatriate sportspeople in the United States
Expatriate soccer players in the United States
People from Adrogué
Sportspeople from Buenos Aires Province